The 1902–03 season was the 11th in the history of the Western Football League.

Like the previous two seasons, Portsmouth were the champions of Division One, and along with all the other members of Division One, also competed in the Southern League during this season. The Division Two champions were Bristol Rovers Reserves.

Division One
One new club joined Division One, which remained at nine clubs after Swindon Town left the league.
Brentford

Division Two
No new clubs joined Division Two, which was reduced to eight clubs from nine after Weston-super-Mare left the league.

References

1902-03
1902–03 in English association football leagues